Timepass is a 2014 Indian Marathi language film. It is a story about teenage love set up in '90s between Dagadu (Prathamesh Parab) and Prajakta (Ketaki Mategaonkar), also starring Bhalchandra Kadam and Vaibhav Mangle. It is directed by Ravi Jadhav who has provided prior hits like Balak-Palak, Balgandharva, Natarang.

The film was the highest grosser of Marathi cinema until its box office record was broken by Ritesh Deshmukh's Lai Bhaari.

This film was later remade in Telugu as Andhra Pori.

Its sequel Timepass 2 was released on 1 May 2015.

A third part to the film, titled Timepass 3 is announced in 2022. It is directed by Ravi Jadhav, under the banner of Athaansh Communications and Zee Studios.Timepass 3 was released on 29 July 2022.

Cast

Prathamesh v. Parab as Dagadu Parab
 Ketaki Mategaonkar as Prajakta Lele
 Vaibhav Mangle as Prajakta's father (Shakal)
 Bhalchandra Kadam as Dagadu’s father (Appa)
 Meghana Erande as Prajakta's mother
 Urmila Kanitkar as Spruha
 Bhushan Pradhan as Prajakta’s brother (Vallabh)
 Aarti Wadgabalkar as Dagadu’s sister
 Manmeet Pem as Dagadu’s friend (Balbharti)
 Sai Gharpure as Prajakta's friend
 Onkar Raut as Dagadu’s friend (Kombada) 
 Anvita Phaltankar as Chanda Tare
 Jayesh Chavan
 Uday sabnis
 Shibani Dandekar as Dancer in 'Hi Poli Saajuk Tupatali'

Plot
Everybody from school criticizes Dagdu for his behavior. On the result day, one student insulted Dagdu about his failure. Dagdu punished him by making him kombada. Someone tells Dagdu that Shantaram, his father, is looking for him. He goes home with band happily. His father beats him up for failing in all subjects and throws him out of the house. His friends console him and advises him to have an affair so that love will blossom in his life. He decides to distribute the newspapers, where he meets Madhav Lele. In college campus he meets Prajakta Lele, the daughter of Madhav Lele and vows to have an affair with her. Dagdu follows Prajakta and they start loving each other. Soon Madhav Lele finds out about the affair and separates them. Dagdu also promises and says that he'll come back.

Soundtrack

Reception
The film has received highly positive reviews. Timepass was a huge financial success and a milestone in Marathi film industry and an all-time blockbuster.
Aparna Phadke of The Times of India praised the performances of the lead actors and commented that the film is "worth a watch", and Shakti Salgaokar of Daily News and Analysis called the picture "an entertaining experience"; both reviewers awarded the film 4/5.

Box office
Timepass opened to thunderous response at Box Office in Maharashtra. In two weeks it surpassed the collections of Duniyadari and became highest-grossing movie in Marathi until its record was broken by Lai Bhaari. It ended up collecting  at the box office in Maharashtra.

See also

Highest grossing Marathi films

References

External links
 

2014 films
2014 romantic comedy films
2010s teen romance films
Indian romantic comedy films
Indian teen romance films
2010s Marathi-language films
Marathi films remade in other languages
Films directed by Ravi Jadhav